Belenois mabella is a butterfly in the family Pieridae. It is found on Madagascar. The habitat consists of forest margins.

References

Butterflies described in 1891
Pierini
Butterflies of Africa